Jharbandh  is a town  in Bargarh district in the Indian state of Odisha. Jharbandh comes under the padmapur Vidhan Sabha in Odisha state and is under the Bargarh Lok Sabha constituency in India

Geography
It is almost  from its district headquarters, Bargarh.
The area around Jharbandh is rain-fed and hence is prone to frequent droughts. To date, the beautiful locale has not been spoiled by industrialisation, but the per capita income is very low.
Nrusinghanath Temple of Gandhamardhan hills is famous in all over the Odisha for lord Nrusingha.

Demographics
 India census, Jharbandh had a population of 2200. Jharbandh has a literacy rate of about nearly 61%.

Jharbandh Block
Jharbandh is the Panchayat Samiti headquarters consisting of 14 grampanchayats.

The grampanchayats are:
 Bhandarpuri
 Dava
 Chhotanki
 Kurlupali
 Bhainsadarha
 Amthi
 Bilaspur
 Chandibhata

 Gothuguda
 Jagdalpur
 Kandadangar
 Kumir
 Laudidarha
 Jharbandh

Politics
Current MLA from Padmapur Assembly Constituency is Pradip Purohit of BJP who won the seat in State elections in 2014. He has won this seat for the first time. He was succeeded by Bijaya Ranjan Singh Bariha of BJD, who won the seat in State elections in 2009.
He also won this seat earlier for BJD in 2000 and for JD in 1995 and in 1990. Other previous MLAs from this seat were Satya Narayan Sahu of INC who won this seat in 2004, in 1985 for INC and in 1980 representing INC(I).

References

Cities and towns in Bargarh district